Severin Schwan (born November 17, 1967) is the CEO of the Roche group. He joined in 1993 as a trainee and has stayed with the company ever since.

Early life and career
He served on the board at Chugai Pharmaceutical Co., Ltd. and is the Vice-President of the International Federation of Pharmaceutical Manufacturers & Associations (IFPMA) and a member of International Business Leaders Advisory Council for the Mayor of Shanghai. He is also on the Board of Directors at Credit Suisse (Schweiz) AG. 

Schwan holds Degrees in Economics from University of Innsbruck, University of York and University of Oxford Mag. rer.soc.oec. (Innsbruck, 1991) and Law from University of Innsbruck Mag. iur. (Innsbruck, 1991) and Doctorate in Law from University of Innsbruck Research studies at University Louvain, Belgium Dr. iur. (Innsbruck, 1993). He is of Austrian nationality.

References

Alumni of the University of York
Living people
1967 births
Chief executives in the pharmaceutical industry
Roche